Josef "Sepp" Kleisl (2 February 1929 in Partenkirchen – 25 September 2008 in Garmisch-Partenkirchen) was a West German ski jumper who competed from 1952 to 1959. He finished tenth in the individual large hill event at the 1952 Winter Olympics in Oslo.

Kleisl's best individual career finish was seventh in an individual normal hill event in Austria in 1954.

References

External links

Sepp Kleisl's obituary 

Olympic ski jumpers of Germany
Olympic ski jumpers of the United Team of Germany
Ski jumpers at the 1952 Winter Olympics
Ski jumpers at the 1956 Winter Olympics
German male ski jumpers
1929 births
2008 deaths
Sportspeople from Garmisch-Partenkirchen
20th-century German people